This is a chronological list of Bangladeshi wicket-keepers, that is, Test cricketers who have kept wicket in a match for Bangladesh.

This list only includes players who have played as the designated keeper for a match. On occasions, another player may have stepped in to relieve the primary wicket-keeper due to injury or the keeper bowling. Figures do not include catches made when the player was a non wicket-keeper.

See also
List of Bangladeshi Test cricketers

References
Bangladesh wicket-keepers

Test wicket-keepers
Bangladesh
Bangladeshi
Wicket-keepers